Acridine yellow, also known as acridine yellow G, acridine yellow H107, basic yellow K, and 3,6-diamino-2,7-dimethylacridine, is a yellow dye with strong bluish-green fluorescence. It is a derivate of acridine. In  histology, it is used as a fluorescent stain, and as a fluorescent probe for non-invasive measurements of cytoplasmic pH changes in whole cells. It is also used as a topical antiseptic. It is usually available as a hydrochloride salt. Acridine yellow damages DNA and is used as a mutagen in microbiology.

Acridine yellow is similar to acridine orange.

According to a publication by Karl Drechsler, a student of Guido Goldschmiedt at the Imperial and Royal University of Vienna, Moriz Freund discovered the substance in 1896 during experiments at the University of Prague. Drechsler was then able to produce the substance in larger quantities and subsequently also examine it more closely.

References

External links
 Acridine yellow absorption and emission spectra

Acridine dyes
Staining dyes
Antiseptics